Ronald Himeekua Ketjijere (born December 12, 1987) is a Namibian football holding midfielder who plays for the Namibia national football team. He is the current captain of the Brave Warriors and can also play as an offensive midfielder.

He previously played for Katutura giant  African Stars in the Namibia Premier League, having joined the team in 2009 from UNAM.

Club career

UNAM F.C.
Ketjijere started off playing for UNAM F.C in the Khomas Second Division and was part of the squad that helped the team gain promotion to the Southern Stream First Division in 2008. His time with UNAM did not last long as he was immediately snatched up by African Stars to play in the Namibia Premier league.

African Stars
In his first season with African Stars, Ketjijere won the MTC Premiership and the Leo NFA Cup, both in the 2009/2010 season. He scored a couple of important goals for African Stars in the three seasons he played for them. He received a couple of nominations and he is one of the past recipients of the FNB Namibia Sport player of the month Award while with African Stars. He was among the top 3 contenders shortlisted for the 2011/2012 MTC Premiership Players' player of the year Award.

University of Pretoria
His inspiring performance and hard-work have not gone unnoticed, something that led to him signing a professional contract with South Africa's University of Pretoria in the 2012/2013 season. After a long wait of paperwork finalisation he finally became eligible to play in the South African elite league and he made his PSL debut, on 23 October 2012 in the Telekom knock-out Cup against Mamelodi Sundowns. He has since cemented his place in AmaTuks's first eleven.

National team career
On 9 February 2011, the touring midfielder played in his Brave Warriors début against The Flames of Malawi which Namibia narrowly lost 2-1 in Windhoek, a match played at the Sam Nujoma Stadium. Since then, he never looked back and was later given the captain arm band of the national senior side.

International goals
Scores and results list Namibia's goal tally first.

References

External links
http://www.mtnfootball.com/africa/south-africa/absa-premiership/players/2012-2013/u-of-pretoria/ronald-ketjijere.html
http://www.amatuks.co.za/article/ronald_ketjijere
FIFA.com
http://www.namibiasport.com.na/node/21503
http://www.newera.com.na/articles/46037/List-of-NPL-award-nominees-puzzles-many
http://www.informante.web.na/index.php?option=com_content&view=article&id=10538:katjijere-signs-for-tuks&catid=18:sports&Itemid=106
http://www.livethescore.com/?p=420

1987 births
Living people
People from Otjozondjupa Region
Namibian men's footballers
Namibian expatriate footballers
Namibia international footballers
Association football midfielders
African Stars F.C. players
University of Pretoria F.C. players
Expatriate soccer players in South Africa
Namibian expatriate sportspeople in South Africa
2019 Africa Cup of Nations players
Namibia A' international footballers
2018 African Nations Championship players